Ma'luf ( Ma'lūf) is a genre of art music in the Andalusian classical music tradition of Algeria, Libya, and Tunisia. It is of Iberian origin and was introduced to the Maghreb by Andalusian refugees.

References

Davis, Ruth (1996). "The Art/Popular Music Paradigm and the Tunisian Ma'lūf." Popular Music, v. 15, no. 3, Middle East Issue (October 1996), pp. 313-323.
Davis, Ruth (1997). "Traditional Arab Music Ensembles in Tunis: Modernizing Al-Turath in the Shadow of Egypt." Asian Music, v. 28, no. 2 (Spring/Summer 1997), pp. 73-108.
Davis, Ruth (1997). "Cultural Policy and the Tunisian Ma'lūf: Redefining a Tradition." Ethnomusicology, v. 41, no. 1 (Winter 1997), pp. 1-21.
Davis, Ruth F. (2005). Ma'luf: Reflections on the Arab Andalusian Music of Tunisia. . .

Algerian music
Libyan music
Tunisian music
Arabic music
Classical and art music traditions